Tredegar Works may refer to:

Tredegar Iron Works in Richmond, Virginia
Tredegar Iron and Coal Company in Wales